Peter C. Aichelburg (born 9 November 1941) is an Austrian physicist well known for his contributions to general relativity, particularly for his joint work with Roman Sexl on the Aichelburg–Sexl ultraboost of the Schwarzschild vacuum.

Life 
Peter Aichelburg is the second child of Ludwig Aichelburg (born 1917) and Martha Michalek (born 1920), a descendant of the Bohemian line of the House of Aichelburg from Carinthia.

Lectures by Walter Thirring influenced him to pursue theoretical problems. He was a postdoc at the International Centre for Theoretical Physics (ICTP), Trieste, Italy from 1968 to 1969. In an interview he recounts that his father was surprised that after such difficult studies he did not immediately obtain a tenured position.

Before his retirement in November 2007 Aichelburg taught at the University of Vienna, where he held a position in the Institute of Theoretical Physics.

Books

References

External links 
 Homepage Peter C. Aichelburg

20th-century Austrian physicists
Living people
Academic staff of the University of Vienna
1941 births